Al-Madinah School may refer to:

Al-Madinah School (Auckland), an Islamic state integrated area school in New Zealand
Al-Madinah School, Derby, an Islamic faith free school in Derbyshire, England, since renamed as Zaytouna Primary School
Al-Madinah School (New York City), a private Islamic faith school in New York, United States

See also
Al-Madina School